Limacidae, also known by their common name the keelback slugs, are a taxonomic family of medium-sized to very large, air-breathing land slugs, terrestrial pulmonate gastropod molluscs in the superfamily Limacoidea.

Distribution 
The distribution of the family Limacidae is the western Palearctic. There are 28 species of Limacidae in Russia and adjacent countries.

Anatomy 
In this family, the number of haploid chromosomes lies between 21 and 25 and also lies between 31 and 35 (according to the values in this table).

Taxonomy

2002 taxonomy 
Zhiltsov & Schileyko (2002) elevated the subfamily Bielziinae to family level, Bielziidae, based on the morphology of the reproductive system of Bielzia coerulans.

2005 taxonomy 
The following two subfamilies were recognized in the taxonomy of Bouchet & Rocroi (2005):
 subfamily Limacinae Lamarck, 1801 - synonyms: Limacopsidae Gerhardt, 1935; Bielziinae I. M. Likharev & Wiktor, 1980
 subfamily Eumilacinae I. M. Likharev & Wiktor, 1980

Genera
Genera in the family Limacidae include:

subfamily Limacinae
 Limax Linnaeus, 1758 - type genus of the family Limacidae
 Limacus Lehmann, 1864; sometimes considered a subgenus of Limax
 Bielzia Clessin, 1887 - with the only species Bielzia coerulans M. Bielz, 1851. Some authors, for example Russian malacologists, classify genus Bielzia within separate family Limacopsidae.
 Caspilimax P. Hesse, 1926
 Caucasolimax Likharev et Wiktor, 1980
 Gigantomilax O. Boettger, 1883
 Gigantomilax csikii Soós, 1924
 Gigantomilax lederi (Boettger, 1883)
 Gigantomilax majoricensis (Heynemann, 1863)
 Lehmannia Heynemann, 1862
 Ambigolimax Pollonera, 1887,; sometimes considered a subgenus of Lehmannia
 Limacopsis Simroth, 1888
 Malacolimax Malm, 1868
 Turcomilax Simroth, 1901

subfamily Eumilacinae
 Eumilax O. Boettger, 1881 - type genus of the subfamily Eumilacinae
 Eumilax brandti (Martens, 1880)
 Metalimax Simroth, 1896

Cladogram 
A cladogram showing the phylogenic relationships of this family to other families within the limacoid clade:

Ecology
Parasites of slugs in this family include larvae of the marsh flies Sciomyzidae, and others.

References

External links 

Slugs of Florida on the UF / IFAS Featured Creatures Web site

 

pl:Pomrowcowate